The R2 Road is an international road in Zimbabwe that runs from Harare (Capital of Zimbabwe), through Bulawayo, to Plumtree border post.

It is a combination of the A5 Highway which is the Harare-Bulawayo Highway and the A7 Highway which is the Bulawayo-Plumtree Highway.  For the purpose of regional identity the highway from Botswana to Harare the capital city of Zimbabwe is named Road 2 (R2).

Source: [Map 9.2 Road Transport Network of Zimbabwe.]

In Harare the road can be picked at the Harare Show Grounds as Samora Machel Avenue.  
and in Plumtree, Zimbabwe it can be picked at the Border Post or in town at the railway station.

Background

The R2 was rehabilitated together with the R3 in the project undertaken by the Zimbabwe National Roads Adminuration (ZINARA) as part of the regional transit highway dubbed the Plumtree-Bulawayo-Harare-Mutare Highway project in 2015.

Operations

The connects Harare and Botswana serving numerous waypoints along the route course.

Harare-Bulawayo Highway

The A5 covers the Harare to Bulawayo via Kwekwe road.

Bulawayo-Plumtree Road

This highway covers Figtree, Zimbabwe, Marula and Plumtree.

A7 Highway actually ends  past Plumtree Town, where it meets Botswana's A1 Highway.

Distance Table

See also

 The Plumtree-Bulawayo-Harare-Mutare Highway
 A7 Highway
 ZINARA

References

Roads in Zimbabwe